Charles P. Allen High School (CPA) is a senior high school located in  Bedford, Nova Scotia, Canada.

This school serves Hammonds Plains, Bedford and a section of Halifax since 2010; for three years at the original CPA and current location since 2013. It serviced Waverley, Fall River, Windsor Junction and Montague Gold Mines until 2000 when Lockview High School was opened. It opened in 1978, six years after Sackville High School was opened and did serve Bedford. In 2009, CPA ranked 2nd with a grade of A- on the AIMS list. 

The school is one of only five schools in HRM that offers the International Baccalaureate Programme; a two year, internationally standardised university-prep program. CPA also offers the O2 program, a three-year program that is unique to Nova Scotia public schools.

School teams
CPA has teams that participate in:
Football
Golf
Baseball
Soccer (male and female teams)
Cross country running
Volleyball (male and female teams)
Basketball (male and female; A and B teams)
Ice hockey (male and female teams)
Field hockey
Skiing
Snowboarding
Badminton
Rugby (male and female teams)
Softball (male and female teams)
Track & field
Karate
Computer programming
Robotics
Curling (male, female, mixed)
Ultimate disc (co-ed; A and B teams)
Chess club (mixed)
Pickleball (senior only)

All of the schools sports teams are called the "Cheetahs". C. P. Allen High is a member of the Nova Scotia School Athletic Federation.

Mascot and school colours
The mascot of Charles P. Allen High is the cheetah. In the new building, there is a large student-made cheetah mosaic on the floor of the main hallway. The school's team colours are white and navy blue.

The International Baccalaureate Programme
Charles P. Allen has been an IB World School since 2007. IB Students at Charles P. Allen can take courses that include English HL/SL, French B HL, French B SL, Spanish B ab initio, Economics HL/SL, Environmental Systems & Societies SL, History HL/SL, History SL (available only in French), Biology HL/SL, Chemistry HL/SL, Physics HL/SL, Math Studies SL, Mathematics SL, Theatre HL/SL, Music HL/SL, Visual Arts HL/SL & Theory of Knowledge. The IB Diploma Prep (DP)/Pre-IB is also available for Grade Ten students.

Enrollment history
The following graph shows the school's population over time as of September 30th of each year.

New Charles P. Allen High School

In April 2009, the Minister of Education announced a new high school would be built in Bedford to replace Charles P. Allen High School. The new Charles P. Allen opened in September 2013. The new building is located at 200 Innovation Drive in Bedford.
The building features an enhanced cafetorium, student lounge, over 50 learning spaces and 2 gymnasiums, one of which is part of the community centre in the building. Outside the school, there is a full-size artificial turf sports field with stadium lighting.
The building is built to be energy efficient and meets LEED Gold specifications.

A new high school on Broad Street will open in September 2023 to alleviate the over-capacity issues at CPA.

See also
 List of schools in Nova Scotia

References

External links
Charles P. Allen High School Website
CP Allen Cheetahs Football
School profile at Halifax Regional School Board
Nova Scotia School Athletic Federation
Founder of Charles P Allen

High schools in Halifax, Nova Scotia
Schools in Halifax, Nova Scotia
International Baccalaureate schools in Nova Scotia